Stanley Point (previously Stanley Bay) is a small suburb located on the North Shore of Auckland, New Zealand. It is located near Devonport, another suburb. It is mostly residential. The Devonport Naval Base lies to the east of the bay on the south side of the Stanley Bay peninsula and is connected to storage facilities on the north side at Ngataringa Bay by a tunnel.

Name
The suburb was known as Stanley Bay until December 2007 when The New Zealand Geographic Board (Ngā Pou Taunaha o Aotearoa) officially named the suburb as Stanley Point. 

During the construction of the Calliope Dock in the 1880s, Stanley Bay was home to a Māori village for the labourers who worked on the dock construction.

Demographics
The statistical area is called Stanley Point.

Stanley Point had a population of 2,025 at the 2018 New Zealand census, a decrease of 15 people (−0.7%) since the 2013 census, and a decrease of 3 people (−0.1%) since the 2006 census. There were 615 households, comprising 1,050 males and 975 females, giving a sex ratio of 1.08 males per female. The median age was 37.7 years (compared with 37.4 years nationally), with 387 people (19.1%) aged under 15 years, 492 (24.3%) aged 15 to 29, 891 (44.0%) aged 30 to 64, and 252 (12.4%) aged 65 or older.

Ethnicities were 88.7% European/Pākehā, 7.6% Māori, 2.1% Pacific peoples, 4.0% Asian, and 5.6% other ethnicities. People may identify with more than one ethnicity.

The percentage of people born overseas was 31.0, compared with 27.1% nationally.

Although some people chose not to answer the census's question about religious affiliation, 58.4% had no religion, 32.1% were Christian, 0.4% had Māori religious beliefs, 0.1% were Hindu, 0.7% were Buddhist and 2.2% had other religions.

Of those at least 15 years old, 684 (41.8%) people had a bachelor's or higher degree, and 87 (5.3%) people had no formal qualifications. The median income was $47,800, compared with $31,800 nationally. 567 people (34.6%) earned over $70,000 compared to 17.2% nationally. The employment status of those at least 15 was that 945 (57.7%) people were employed full-time, 237 (14.5%) were part-time, and 33 (2.0%) were unemployed.

Education

Notes

External links
Stanley Bay School
Chaos In The CBD - 78 To Stanley Bay
Photographs of Stanley Bay held in Auckland Libraries' heritage collections.

Suburbs of Auckland
North Shore, New Zealand
Populated places around the Waitematā Harbour